A Dinner Engagement is a one-act comic opera by Lennox Berkeley, (his Op. 45) to a libretto by Paul Dehn.

The opera was written for Benjamin Britten's English Opera Group. It premiered at the Jubilee Hall, Aldeburgh Festival, in 1954; the first London performance was at Sadler's Wells Theatre on 7 October 1954, with the same cast. The first performance in the USA was at the University of Washington in 1958.

Berkeley's 1967 one-act opera, Castaway (also to a libretto by Dehn) was written as a companion piece to A Dinner Engagement.

Roles

Synopsis
The impoverished Earl and Countess of Dunmow are preparing a dinner at their flat in Chelsea for the wealthy Grand Duchess of Monteblanco (where the Earl was once ambassador) and her son Prince Phillipe. They are hoping that they can encourage the Prince into marrying their recalcitrant daughter Susan. Despite food burning in the oven, demands from an errand boy for payment of overdue grocer's bills and the eccentricities of Mrs. Kneebone, hired as domestic help for the occasion, the plan is eventually successful.

References
Notes

Sources
 Anon (2018), "The Long Christmas Dinner and A Dinner Engagement" (programme), London: Guildhall School of Music and Drama.
 Rosenthal, Harold and Warrack, John (1979). The Concise Oxford Dictionary of Opera, 2nd edition. London: Oxford University Press, 
 Wearing, J. P. (2014). The London Stage 1950–1959: A Calendar of Productions, Performers, and Personnel, Plymouth: Rowman & Littlefield. 

Operas
1954 operas
English-language operas
Operas by Lennox Berkeley
Operas set in London
Operas set in the 20th century
Libretti by Paul Dehn